Hayato Hirai is a Japanese weightlifter. He represented Japan at the 2019 World Weightlifting Championships.

References 

Living people
1994 births
Japanese male weightlifters